DWHR (106.3 FM), broadcasting as 106.3 Yes The Best, is a radio station owned and operated by Manila Broadcasting Company through its licensee Pacific Broadcasting System. The station's studio and transmitter are located at the 4th floor, Hotel Le Duc, Lyceum Northwestern University Compound, Tapuac District, Dagupan.

References

Radio stations in Dagupan
Radio stations established in 1994
Pacific Broadcasting Systems stations